HD 154345 is a star in the northern constellation of Hercules. With an apparent visual magnitude of +6.76 it is a challenge to view with the naked eye, but using binoculars it is an easy target. The distance to this star is 59.7 light years based on parallax, but it is drifting closer with a radial velocity of −47 km/s. At least one exoplanet is orbiting this star.

The stellar classification of HD 154345 is G8V, matching an ordinary G-type main-sequence star that is generating energy by core hydrogen fusion. The magnetic activity cycle of this star is curiously correlated with the radial velocity variations induced by its putative planetary companion. It is around four billion years old and is spinning with a rotation period of 28 days. The star is smaller and less massive than the Sun. It is radiating 62% of the luminosity of the Sun from its photosphere at an effective temperature of 5,557 K.

Planetary system
In 2006, a long-period, wide-orbiting planet was observed by radial velocity, and published in May 2007, gaining the designation HD 154345 b.

The complete observation of its nine-year orbit rules out any interior planets of minimum mass (m sini) greater than 0.3 Jupiter. The star rotates at an inclination of 50 degrees relative to Earth.  It is probable that the planet shares that inclination. It has been called a "Jupiter twin".

It forms a stable region where an Earth-mass exoplanet could orbit.

The existence of HD 154345 b has been controversial, but in 2021 its planetary status was confirmed.

References

External links
 The Extrasolar Planets Encyclopedia: HD 154345

G-type main-sequence stars
Planetary systems with one confirmed planet

Hercules (constellation)
154345
Durchmusterung objects
0651
083389